City of Gold is a 2015 documentary film directed by American filmmaker, Laura Gabbert. The film profiles food critic Jonathan Gold and the influence of his writing on Los Angeles culture and beyond.

Release 
City of Gold debuted at the 2015 Sundance Film Festival and was released the following year by IFC Films/Sundance Selects in theaters and on DVD.

Reception 
Akiva Gottlieb of the Los Angeles Times wrote that City of Gold "Offers an almost utopian vision of urban life in which good food can temporarily transcend borders of race, class and gender." Rolling Stones Peter Travers stated "In search of fresh culinary treasures, Gold travels the hidden corners of a too-familiar city and we get to fall in love with L.A. again." According to Melena Ryzik of The New York Times, "The documentary does as much to demystify and yet romanticize Los Angeles as any Chandler novel." Conor Bateman of 4:3 Film summed up that City of Gold is "A Love Letter to the art of discovery."

References

External links 

American documentary films
IFC Films films
2010s English-language films
2010s American films